Samuel Lewis Cunningham Jr (August 15, 1950 – September 7, 2021), nicknamed "Bam", was an American professional football player who was a fullback in the National Football League (NFL) for 10 seasons with the New England Patriots. He played college football at USC, where he was named a first-team All-American and received MVP honors in the 1973 Rose Bowl.

Selected in the first round of the 1973 NFL Draft by the Patriots, Cunningham became the franchise's all-time leading rusher. He was inducted to the College Football Hall of Fame in 2010. The same year, he was also inducted to the Patriots Hall of Fame.

College career
Cunningham was a letterman for University of Southern California's football team from 1970 through 1972 where he played fullback. He was named an All-American in 1972, and was a member of USC’s 1972 national championship team. He scored four touchdowns in the 1973 Rose Bowl, which is still the modern-day Rose Bowl record, and was named Player of the Game. He was inducted into the Rose Bowl Hall of Fame in 1992 and into the College Football Hall of Fame in 2010.

In 1970, he was part of USC's "all-black" backfieldthe first one of its kind in Division I (NCAA) historythat included quarterback Jimmy Jones and running back Clarence Davis. He had a notable debut performance (135 yards, two touchdowns) against an all-white University of Alabama football team, as USC beat Alabama 42–21 in Birmingham on September 12, 1970. His performance in the game was reportedly a factor in convincing the University of Alabama and its fans to let Coach Bear Bryant integrate Southern football. Jerry Claiborne, a former Bryant assistant, said, "Sam Cunningham did more to integrate Alabama in 60 minutes than Martin Luther King Jr. did in 20 years."

Professional career
In only his second year 1974, Cunningham gained 811 yards and nine touchdowns as he led the New England Patriots to a surprising 4–0 start before faltering to a 7–7 finish. In 1977, he gained a career-high 1,015 yards and scored four touchdowns, and also caught 42 receptions for 370 yards and a touchdown. He played his entire career (1973–1982) with the Patriots and was a 1978 Pro Bowl selection. Cunningham was an integral part of the 1978 Patriots, who set an NFL record for rushing yards as a team with 3,165. This record stood for more than forty years and was not broken until the 2019 Baltimore Ravens.

Cunningham finished his career with 5,453 rushing yards, 210 receptions for 1,905 yards, and 49 touchdowns. He was the older brother of former UNLV and NFL quarterback Randall Cunningham and uncle of Randall Cunningham II and world champion high jumper Vashti Cunningham.

Cunningham was the 2010 Inductee to the Patriots Hall of Fame.

Death
Cunningham died on September 7, 2021, at the age of 71.

References

External links
 New England Patriots bio
 

1950 births
2021 deaths
American football fullbacks
New England Patriots players
USC Trojans football players
American Conference Pro Bowl players
College Football Hall of Fame inductees
Players of American football from California
Sportspeople from Santa Barbara, California
African-American players of American football
20th-century African-American sportspeople
21st-century African-American people